The following outline is provided as an overview of and topical guide to Niue:

Niue – an island nation in free association with New Zealand located in the South Pacific Ocean.  It is commonly known as the "Rock of Polynesia". Natives of the island call it merely "The Rock". Although self-governing, Niue is in free association with New Zealand, meaning that the Sovereign in Right of New Zealand is also Niue's head of state. Most diplomatic relations are conducted by New Zealand on Niue's behalf. Niue is located 2,400 kilometres northeast of New Zealand in a triangle between Tonga, Samoa, and the Cook Islands. The Niuean language and the English language are both taught in schools and used in day-to-day business and communications. The people are predominantly Polynesian.

General reference 

 Pronunciation:
 Common English country name:  Niue
 Official English country name:  Niue
 Common endonym(s):  List of countries and capitals in native languages
 Official endonym(s):  List of official endonyms of present-day nations and states
 Adjectival(s): Niuean
 Demonym(s):
 Etymology: Name of Niue
 ISO country codes:  NU, NIU, 570
 ISO region codes:  See ISO 3166-2:NU
 Internet country code top-level domain:  .nu

Geography of Niue 

Geography of Niue
 Niue is: An island country.
 Location:
 Western Hemisphere and Southern Hemisphere
 Pacific Ocean
 South Pacific Ocean
 Oceania
 Polynesia
 Time zone:  UTC-11
 Extreme points of Niue
 High:  unnamed location near Mutalau settlement 
 Low:  South Pacific Ocean 0 m
 Land boundaries:  none
 Coastline:  South Pacific Ocean 64 km
 Population of Niue: 1,600  - 218th most populous country

 Area of Niue: 260 km2
 Atlas of Niue

Environment of Niue 

 Climate of Niue
 Renewable energy in Niue
 Wildlife of Niue
 Fauna of Niue
 Birds of Niue
 Mammals of Niue

Natural geographic features of Niue 

 Islands of Niue
 Rivers of Niue
 Valleys of Niue
 World Heritage Sites in Niue: None

Regions of Niue 

Regions of Niue

Ecoregions of Niue 

List of ecoregions in Niue
 Tongan tropical moist forests

Administrative divisions of Niue 
None

Municipalities of Niue 

 Capital of Niue: Alofi
 Cities of Niue

Demography of Niue 

Demographics of Niue

Government and politics of Niue 

Politics of Niue
 Form of government:
 Capital of Niue: Alofi
 Elections in Niue
 Political parties in Niue

Branches of the government of Niue 

Government of Niue

Executive branch of the government of Niue 
 Head of state: President of Niue,
 Head of government: Premier of Niue, Dalton Tagelagi
 Cabinet of Niue

Legislative branch of the government of Niue 

 Parliament of Niue (unicameral)

Judicial branch of the government of Niue 

Court system of Niue

Foreign relations of Niue 

Foreign relations of Niue
 Diplomatic missions in Niue
 Diplomatic missions of Niue

International organization membership 
Niue is a member of:
African, Caribbean, and Pacific Group of States (ACP)
Food and Agriculture Organization (FAO)
International Fund for Agricultural Development (IFAD)
Organisation for the Prohibition of Chemical Weapons (OPCW)
Pacific Islands Forum (PIF)
Secretariat of the Pacific Community (SPC)
South Pacific Regional Trade and Economic Cooperation Agreement (Sparteca)
United Nations Educational, Scientific, and Cultural Organization (UNESCO)
Universal Postal Union (UPU)
World Health Organization (WHO)
World Meteorological Organization (WMO)

Law and order in Niue 

Law of Niue
 Constitution of Niue
 Human rights in Niue
 LGBT rights in Niue

Military of Niue 

 Command
 Commander-in-chief:
 Forces

Local government in Niue 

Local government in Niue

History of Niue 

History of Niue
Timeline of the history of Niue
Current events of Niue

Culture of Niue 

Culture of Niue
 Cuisine of Niue
 Festivals in Niue
 Languages of Niue: Niuean language, English language
 Mass media in Niue
 National symbols of Niue
 Flag of Niue
 National anthem of Niue: Ko e Iki he Lagi
 Seal of Niue
 People of Niue
 Women in Niue
 Public holidays in Niue
 Religion in Niue
 Sikhism in Niue
 World Heritage Sites: None

Art in Niue 
 Literature of Niue
 Music of Niue

Sport in Niue 

Sport in Niue
 Rugby union in Niue
 Soccer (football) in Niue
 Niue at the Olympics

Economy and infrastructure of Niue 

Economy of Niue
 Economic rank, by nominal GDP (2007): 190th (one hundred and ninetieth)
 Agriculture in Niue
 Communications in Niue
 Internet in Niue
 Companies of Niue
Currency of Niue: Dollar
ISO 4217: NZD
 Tourism in Niue
 Transport in Niue

Education in Niue 

Education in Niue

Infrastructure of Niue
 Transportation in Niue
 Niue International Airport

See also 

Niue
List of resident commissioners of Niue
List of international rankings
Niuean language
Outline of geography
Outline of New Zealand
Outline of Oceania

References

External links 

Niue Film Commission
Niue Tourism
Niuean Government official site
Niue Island.nu portal for the people of Niue

CIA World Factbook - Niue
 Niue Island food and caves

Niue